Hollyhock Lifelong Learning Centre is a not-for-profit educational institute in British Columbia, Canada. It offers programs in "health and wellness" "creativity", "wisdom teachings" and "leadership development" on its Cortes Island campus. It also offers programs at various locations in Vancouver throughout the year.

History

Hollyhock was founded in 1982 by Rex Weyler, Siobhan Robinsong and Lee Robinsong who met at Greenpeace. While beach walking on Cortes Island, they saw the abandoned hand-crafted buildings of the former Cold Mountain Institute. Siobhan drew Rex's attention to crimson hollyhocks peeking over a hawthorn hedge. Days before, Rex was given that same vision by an intuitive seer at the Vancouver Folk Music Festival. Friends Peggy Taylor, Rick Ingrasci, Torkin Wakefield, Charles Steinberg, Yvonne Kipp and Michael Moore joined to purchase the land. Many others invested over the years, and in 1982, this group of 30 'founders' purchased the abandoned Cold Mountain Institute. Dana Bass Solomon joined in the late 1990s as board member, soon as CEO. With Joel Solomon, Board Chair, (whom she later married), together they have led two decades of mission advancement. In 2008 the partner group donated full ownership and Hollyhock Leadership Institute became a registered charity.

Programming
Over the years, Hollyhock has offered a wide range of personal, spiritual and leadership development programs to an international clientele, serving 1,800 to 2,300 guests per year. The Centre hosts education and training  on topics including activism,  creative writing, group facilitation, singing, cooking, painting, drawing, entrepreneurship, dance, photography, leadership, social ventures, woodcarving, storytelling, kayaking, animal communication, relationships, mindfulness, nonviolent communication, spiritual chanting, meditation, Tibetan Buddhism, Kabbalah, hara hachi bu, yoga, morphic resonance, holistic approaches for dealing with cancer and integrative medicine.

Prominent instructors at Hollyhock have included Robert Bateman, Gabor Maté, Jane Siberry, Patrick Lane and Nick Bantock. Hollyhock operates a scholarship fund. In 2008, the centre distributed CAN $97,000 to attendees.

Garden

Hollyhock operates a renowned one-acre French-intensive garden on the property. Flowers and food from the garden are used in the retreat centre's meals.

Political links
The CEO is Dana Bass Solomon, and the board chair is her husband, Joel Solomon, both of whom have connections to Vancouver Mayor Gregor Robertson. Robertson was the treasurer of Hollyhock Centre Ltd. in 2003 and 2004, and served on the board. A number of connections have been drawn between Vancouver City Hall and Hollyhock, in part due to the number of people hired by the City of Vancouver who have connections to the retreat centre. Board chair Solomon has responded to such claims stating that Hollyhock provides space to network for like-minded people around social and environmental topics, and have the possibility of making business connections. He has also stated that Hollyhock's programs attracted attendees from across the political spectrum.

References

Spiritual retreats
Cortes Island